Elvis: A Legendary Performer Volume 2 is a compilation album featuring recordings by American singer and musician Elvis Presley. As with the first volume of the series, issued in 1974, the collection was a mixture of previously released and never-before-released recordings.

The album was certified Gold on October 25, 1977 and Platinum and 2× Platinum on July 15, 1999 by the RIAA.

Content
In this second volume of the Presley Legendary Performer series, RCA released for the first time "Harbor Lights", a ballad Presley recorded during his first session for Sun Records in July, 1954. This marked the first time since 1965 that RCA had released any unissued recordings from the Sun Records archives. Other previously unreleased material on the album included an alternate take of Presley's 1956 hit "I Want You, I Need You, I Love You", several previously unissued performances from the 1968 NBC TV special, the song "A Cane and a High Starched Collar" (the RCA 8 track tape version had a false start to this song) from the soundtrack of the 1960 film Flaming Star, and Presley's 1960 recording of  "Such a Night" (the 8 track tape version had several false starts to this song). A pair of previously unreleased interview recordings were also included on this album.

The Legendary Performer series would continue with Elvis: A Legendary Performer Volume 3, which was released in 1978.

Track listing

References

External links

Elvis Presley compilation albums
1976 compilation albums
RCA Records compilation albums